The 1937–38 season was Newport County's 16th season in the Third Division South and 17th overall in the Football League. They had been ever-present in the third tier except for the 1931–32 season since the introduction of the Football League Third Division in 1920.

The match with Cardiff City on 16 October 1937 recorded the highest-ever attendance at Somerton Park.

Season review

Results summary

Results by round

Fixtures and results

Third Division South

FA Cup

Division Three South Cup

Welsh Cup

League table

Pld = Matches played; W = Matches won; D = Matches drawn; L = Matches lost; F = Goals for; A = Goals against;GA = Goal average; GD = Goal difference; Pts = Points

External links
 Newport County 1937-1938 : Results
 Newport County football club match record: 1938
 Welsh Cup 1937/38

References

1937-38
English football clubs 1937–38 season
1937–38 in Welsh football